Nimbus 3 (also called Nimbus-B2) was a meteorological satellite. It was the third in a series of the Nimbus program.

Launch 
Nimbus 3 was launched on April 14, 1969, by a Thor-Agena rocket from Vandenberg Air Force Base, Lompoc, CA. The spacecraft functioned nominally until 22 January 1972. The satellite orbited the Earth once every 1 hour and 47 minutes, at an inclination of 99.9°.

Mission

Nimbus 3, the third in a series of second-generation meteorological research and development satellites, was designed to serve as a stabilized, earth-oriented platform for the testing of advanced meteorological sensor systems and the collecting of meteorological data. The polar-orbiting spacecraft consisted of three major elements: (1) a sensory ring, (2) solar paddles, and (3) the control system housing. The solar paddles and the control system housing were connected to the sensory ring by a truss structure, giving the satellite the appearance of an ocean buoy.

The torus-shaped sensory ring, which formed the satellite base, housed the electronics equipment and battery modules. The lower surface of the torus ring provided mounting space for sensors and telemetry antennas. An H-frame structure mounted within the center of the torus provided support for the larger experiments and tape recorders. Mounted on the control system housing, which was located on top of the spacecraft, were sun sensors, horizon scanners, gas nozzles for attitude control, and a command antenna.

Use of the attitude control subsystem (ACS) permitted the spacecraft's orientation to be controlled to within plus or minus 1 deg for all three axes (pitch, roll, and yaw). Primary experiments consisted of (1) a satellite infrared spectrometer (SIRS) for determining the vertical temperature profiles of the atmosphere, (2) an infrared interferometer spectrometer (IRIS) for measuring the emission spectra of the earth-atmosphere system, (3) both high- and medium-resolution infrared radiometers (HRIR/MRIR) for yielding information on the distribution and intensity of infrared radiation emitted and reflected by the earth and its atmosphere, (4) a monitor of ultraviolet solar energy (MUSE) for detecting solar UV radiation, (5) an image dissector camera system (IDCS) for providing daytime cloudcover pictures in both real-time mode, using the real time transmission system (RTTS), and tape recorder mode, using the high data rate storage system, (6) a radioisotope thermoelectric generator (RTG), SNAP-19, to assess the operational capability of radioisotope power for space applications, and (7) an interrogation, recording and location system (IRLS) experiment designed to locate, interrogate, record, and retransmit meteorological and geophysical data from remote collection stations.

Nimbus 3 was successful and performed normally until July 22, 1969, when the IRIS experiment failed. The HRIR and SIRS experiments were terminated on January 25, 1970, and June 21, 1970, respectively. The remaining experiments continued operation until September 25, 1970, when the rear horizon scanner failed. Without this horizon scanner, it was impossible to maintain proper spacecraft attitude, thus making most experimental observations useless. All spacecraft operations were terminated on January 22, 1972.

References

Weather satellites of the United States
Spacecraft launched in 1969